Monika Bulanda (born on 13 April 1983) is a musician and visual artist. From an early age, Bulanda showed interest in art, music, theatre, sport, language, and culture, but chose music and art as her primary focus.

She has collaborated with several artists on musical and artistic projects while living in different places around the world, such as China, Turkey, India, Malaysia, and France. She currently works and lives in Istanbul, Turkey.

She released her first solo album Forever I'll Be Young under the Turkish music label 3 Adım Müzik.

Life and career

1983–1997: Early life
Bulanda was born in Cracow. She was the youngest member of a local art gallery where she took painting classes at the Maria Kaminska and Ignacy Kurowski atelier, while at the same time taking part in various painting competitions. She started private piano lessons at the age of 6, and later began learning to play the drums from Wiesław Piszczyński who encouraged her to continue with music professionally. At the age of 13, she began performing at local weddings and events with professional bands. She also participated in regional young instrumentalist competitions which she won a couple of times in a row.

1997–2004: High school and career
Preparing to enter art school, she attended VI Liceum Ogólnokształcące im. A.Mickiewicza in Cracow, specializing in linguistics. She graduated with a bilingual (Spanish and Polish) education. As the age of 16, she started to play in music clubs in Cracow, being named as the first female drummer in Poland. During jam sessions and concerts, she met musicians such as Paweł Maciwoda and Marek Stryszowski whom she performed with. She was voluntarily working at the Warsaw Summer Jazz Days and Jazz Jamboree where she met renowned jazz musicians with whom she played at jam sessions. She appeared in the "Droga do Gwiazd" young talent contest where Sony Music proposed her to join the female pop-rock band Matka, which she accepted. Playing with Matka she gained most of her performing experience, appearing on different programs such as "Kuba Wojewódzki" talk-show, "Bar" and other soap operas. When she was 19, the band Matka started to work with polish pop singer Michal Wisniewski. She continued to develop her drumming skills with Artur Malik at the Cracow School of Jazz and Contemporary Music, later Wroclaw School of Jazz Music under Andrzej Lewandowski's tetelage.  She entered Katowice Academy of Jazz Music and continued to study with Adam Buczek. At the same time, she studied in Warsaw at the Chopin School of Music "Bednarska" where she was a student of Kazimierz Jonkisz. To continue her interest in linguistics she entered the University of Warsaw at the Oriental Department studying Chinese Language and Culture. Bulanda simultaneously graduated from both universities and holds BA in Music and BA in Sinology.

2007–2008: China
After graduating from both universities, she quit all her bands, and left to Beijing, China. She joined the Beijing Film Academy at the Foreign Department of Chinese Language and Culture. Soon after she started to appear at Beijing Music scene playing with different Chinese musicians and bands in clubs and during music festivals around China. She was also invited to conduct drums workshops for Sonor Drums in Kuala Lumpur, Malaysia what resulted with releasing the workshop DVD.

2008–present: Turkey
Invited by American bass player Tony Jones to join his project in Turkey, she came to Bodrum but then moved to Istanbul and continues to live there. She collaborates with Turkish pop singer Kenan Doğulu as well as Mabel Matiz playing percussion. She is also a drummer on popular TV Show in Turkey- Elin Oğlu. She played drums for Turkish guitarist Bilal Karaman on his album Bahane and Turkish pianist Selen Gülün with her project Kadın Matınesı, getting involved in many DJ acts as well as appearing on Jazz Festivals and concerts through collaborations with jazz musicians. Besides cooperating with many Turkish musicians, she began developing her music project - writing music, lyrics and singing. In April 2015 she released her solo pop album Forever I'll Be Young which she produced under Turkish music label 3 Adım Müzik.

Painting
Bulanda began taking intensive painting classes at the local art gallery in Stary Sącz and as a 13-year-old she won her first prize in a regional painting competition.

She planned to enter art school, but due to her allergy of paint she choose linguistic school instead. For many years she continued painting as a hobby, and collaborated on different art projects of other artists. After visiting New York in 2010, inspired by its architecture and it's multicultural aspect, she developed her unique mixed technique. Soon after she signed a contract with one of the biggest galleries of contemporary art in Istanbul. Her works were presented at the Contemporary Istanbul Art Fair.  Soon after she opened couple of group and solo exhibitions. She collaborated with Dutch artist Mathilde ter Heijne on her project and also Levent Kunt on his project at the Depo Culture Centre.

The emotional relationship she that established with the cities where she lived was an important matter, which formed the basis of her art.

Discography

References

Living people
Musicians from Kraków
Drum and bass musicians
Polish painters
1983 births
Artists from Kraków